Marc Alexander Edwards (born November 17, 1974) is a former professional American football player who played in the National Football League for 9 years from 1997-2005. 

Edwards attended Norwood High School in Norwood, Ohio, and played starting middle linebacker on the school's football team alongside Robert Bales, whom he replaced as the team's starting middle linebacker as a freshman star.

Edwards was named Ohio's Mr. Football in 1992 as the state's top player. He played college football at Notre Dame. Following his team's upset win over the #5-ranked University of Southern California Trojans on October 21, 1995, Edwards became the second Fighting Irish player ever to be carried off the field by his teammates; the first was Daniel E. "Rudy" Ruettiger in 1975. Edwards's senior year he was picked as a team captain at Notre Dame.

Edwards was selected by the San Francisco 49ers in the second round (55th overall) of the 1997 NFL Draft. After two years in San Francisco, Edwards played the following two years for the Cleveland Browns from 1999 to 2000. He has also played for the New England Patriots from 2001 to 2002 and the Jacksonville Jaguars from 2003 to 2004. Edwards's high school retired his #44 Jersey on September 11, 2009. In October 2010, a book by Aaron M. Smith about Edwards's life, Odyssey: From Blue Collar, Ohio To Super Bowl Champion, was published.

References

1974 births
Living people
People from Norwood, Ohio
Players of American football from Ohio
American football fullbacks
Notre Dame Fighting Irish football players
San Francisco 49ers players
Cleveland Browns players
New England Patriots players
Jacksonville Jaguars players
Chicago Bears players